Arnold Dwarika (born 23 August 1973 in Upper Santa Cruz, Trinidad) is a retired Trinidadian football player, who played as a midfielder for the Trinidad and Tobago national team. He went to school at Malick Senior Comprehensive in Trinidad.

Career
Most of his career has been spent in his homeland in the TT Pro League but Dwarika has also had stints in Europe with Scottish side East Fife and Asia with Chinese clubs Qingdao Hailifeng and Guangzhou Pharmaceutical.

Dwarika scored two goals in Trinidad and Tobago's 3–2 loss to the United States during the 1996 Gold Cup. He was a regular member of the Trinidad and Tobago senior squad from 1993, and also played in the under-23 Olympic squad of 1996. He was not considered for the national side for some time after 2004, ruling him out of contention for the 2006 FIFA World Cup, but later returned to the team.

Honours

Defence Force
 TT National League
 Winner: 1993

Al-Ansar
 Lebanese Premier League
 Winner: 1997

Joe Public
 CFU Club Championship
 Winner (2): 1998, 2000
 Runner-up: 2007
 TT Pro League
 Winner: 2006
 Trinidad and Tobago FA Trophy
 Winner: 2007
 Trinidad and Tobago Classic
 Winner: 2007
 Kashif & Shanghai Knockout Tournament
 Winner: 2007

W Connection
 Trinidad and Tobago FA Trophy
 Winner: 2003
 Trinidad and Tobago League Cup
 Winner: 2005
 Trinidad and Tobago Classic
 Winner: 2005
 Trinidad and Tobago Pro Bowl
 Runner-up: 2005

North East Starts
 Trinidad and Tobago FA Trophy
 Runner-up: 2011

Individual
 CONCACAF Gold Cup Allstar team: 2000
 TT Pro League Golden Boot: 1999 (45 Goals)
 Caribbean Footballer of the Year: 1999
 Trinidad & Tobago footballer of the year (3): 1998, 1999, 2001

References

Sources
 
 RSSSF stats

1973 births
Expatriate footballers in Scotland
Living people
Trinidad and Tobago expatriate footballers
Trinidad and Tobago footballers
Trinidad and Tobago international footballers
East Fife F.C. players
Joe Public F.C. players
Scottish Football League players
China League One players
Guangzhou F.C. players
TT Pro League players
Expatriate footballers in China
Trinidad and Tobago expatriate sportspeople in China
2000 CONCACAF Gold Cup players
2002 CONCACAF Gold Cup players
Trinidad and Tobago expatriate sportspeople in Scotland
Association football midfielders
1996 CONCACAF Gold Cup players